{{Speciesbox
| image = Busycon sinistrum (lightning whelk) on marine beach (Cayo Costa Island, Florida, USA) (23700747493).jpg
| image_caption = On Cayo Costa Island, Florida
| genus = Sinistrofulgur
| species = sinistrum
| authority = (Hollister, 1958)
| synonyms =

| synonyms_ref = <ref name="WoRMS">{{cite WoRMS |author= |year= |title=Sinistrofulgur sinistrum' |id=862934 |access-date=25 October 2022}}</ref>
}}Sinistrofulgur sinistrum is an edible species of large predatory sea snail in the family Busyconidae, the busycon whelks. This species is often confused with Sinistrofulgur perversum, and with Busycon contrarium, which is now considered an exclusively fossil species.

Description

This species normally has a sinistral (left-handed) shell, thus the scientific name. (When the shell is held with the spiral end up, the opening is on the left side.) The spire is low and the siphonal canal is long. There is a distinct shoulder where the spire meets the body whorl; knobs of small to moderate size are found at the shoulder. The base color of the shell is variable but is usually pale, and the shell is marked with dark stripes that run down its long axis.

Distribution
This marine species occurs in the Gulf of Mexico, the Caribbean Sea, and the North Atlantic Ocean.

References

 Hollister S.C. 1958, A review of the genus Busycon and its allies - Part I: Palaeontographica Americana IV(28): 48-126, pls. 8-18.
  Petuch E.J., Myers R.F. & Berschauer D.P. (2015). The living and fossil Busycon whelks: Iconic mollusks of eastern North America''. San Diego Shell Club. viii + 195 pp.

External links
 

sinistrum
Gastropods described in 1958